The 2006–07 C.D. Motagua season in the Honduran football league was divided into two tournaments, Apertura and Clausura. F.C. Motagua was able to win its 11th title in the Apertura tournament, giving them the chance to qualify to the 2007 UNCAF Interclub Cup.

Apertura

After having achieved 31 points in 18 rounds, F.C. Motagua qualified to the Final round in which it faced Hispano F.C. With a 6–1 score on aggregate in favor, they advanced to the Final against city archrival Club Deportivo Olimpia. The "whites" moved their home match to San Pedro Sula, believing they would benefit from the fact that this city has very few Motagua fans; despite that, Motagua displayed one of the best games of the season with a 3–1 final score, and so ensured their eleventh national championship.

Squad
 All data is updated prior the beginning of the season.

Standings

Matches

Results by round

Regular season

Semifinals

 Motagua 6–2 Hispano on aggregate.

Final

 Motagua 4–2 Olimpia on aggregate.

Clausura

With the title in their possession, F.C. Motagua were looking to repeat this performance for the Clausura tournament; in the Regular season, they exhibited a very irregular performance, but still made it to the Semifinals where they lost to Real C.D. España on 5 May 2007 1–4 on aggregate. Only one week later, Edy Vasquez, a permanent player in the Motagua's line-ups, died following a car crash in Tegucigalpa at the age of 23.

Squad

Standings

Matches

Results by round

Regular season

Semifinals

 Motagua 1–4 Real España on aggregate.

References

External links
Motagua Official Website

F.C. Motagua seasons
Motagua
Motagua